The Batschke, also Floßgraben, is a small river of Saxony, Germany. It flows into the Pleiße near Leipzig. Much of its course has been disrupted by lignite mining.

See also
List of rivers of Saxony

Rivers of Saxony
Rivers of Germany